Harvey Young (October 20, 1920 – August 1, 1959), nicknamed "Pep", was an American former Negro league shortstop who played in the 1940s.

A native of Nashville, Young made his Negro leagues debut in 1941 with the New York Black Yankees. He went on to play for the Baltimore Elite Giants and Atlanta Black Crackers in 1943, and finished his career in 1944 with the Kansas City Monarchs.

References

External links
 and Baseball-Reference Black Baseball stats and Seamheads

1920 births
1959 deaths
Atlanta Black Crackers players
Baltimore Elite Giants players
Kansas City Monarchs players
New York Black Yankees players